Befiradol (F-13,640; NLX-112) is an experimental drug being studied for the treatment of levodopa-induced dyskinesia.  It is a potent and selective 5-HT1A receptor full agonist.

Pharmacology
In recombinant cell lines expressing human 5-HT1A receptors, befiradol exhibits high agonist efficacy for a variety of signal transduction read-outs, including ERK phosphorylation, G-protein activation, receptor internalization and adenylyl cyclase inhibition. In rat hippocampal membranes it preferentially activates GalphaO proteins. In neurochemical experiments, befiradol activated 5-HT1A autoreceptors in rat dorsal Raphe nucleus as well as 5-HT1A heteroreceptors on pyramidal neurons in the frontal cortex. It has powerful analgesic and antiallodynic effects comparable to those of high doses of opioid painkillers, but with fewer and less prominent side effects, as well as little or no development of tolerance with repeated use.

A structure–activity relationship (SAR) study revealed that replacement of the dihalophenyl moiety by 3-benzothienyl increases maximal efficacy from 84% to 124% (Ki=2.7 nM).

History

Befiradol was discovered and developed by Pierre Fabre Médicament, a French pharmaceuticals company. In September 2013, befiradol was out-licensed to Neurolixis, a California-based biotechnology company. Neurolixis announced that it intends to re-purpose befiradol for the treatment of levodopa-induced dyskinesia in Parkinson's disease. In support of this indication, Neurolixis received several research grants from the Michael J. Fox Foundation and preclinical data was published describing the activity of befiradol in animal models of Parkinson's disease. In January 2018, the British charity Parkinson's UK announced that it had awarded Neurolixis a grant to advance development of befiradol up to clinical phase in Parkinson's disease patients. In March 2019, Neurolixis announced that the US Food and Drug Administration (FDA) gave a positive response to Neurolixis' Investigational New Drug (IND) application for NLX-112 to be tested in a Phase 2 clinical study in Parkinson's disease patients with troublesome levodopa-induced dyskinesia.
Studies published in 2020 using non-human primate models of Parkinson's disease, (MPTP-treated marmosets and MPTP-treated macaques), found that befiradol potently reduced Levodopa-induced dyskinesia at oral doses as low as 0.1 to 0.4 mg/kg.
On 22 November 2020, The Sunday Times reported that the two charities, Parkinson's UK and Michael J. Fox Foundation, were jointly investing $2 million to support a clinical trial on befiradol in Parkinson's disease patients with troublesome Levodopa-induced dyskinesia, a potentially "life changing" drug. On 23 November 2020, Parkinson's UK and Michael J. Fox Foundation, confirmed their funding in an official announcement. Neurolixis announced on 30 November 2021 the start of patient recruitment in the clinical trial. The trial is listed on the U.S. National Library of Medicine clinical trials register.

See also 
 Eptapirone
 Flesinoxan
 F-15,599

References 

Analgesics
Pyridines
Secondary amines
Piperidines
Benzamides
Chlorobenzenes
Fluoroarenes